The 2016–17 AWIHL season is the tenth season of the Australian Women's Ice Hockey League. It ran from 29 October 2016 until 26 February 2017.

League business

Regular season
The regular season began on 29 October 2016 and finished on 26 February 2017

October

November

December

January

February

Standings
''Note: GP = Games played; W = Wins; SW = Shootout Wins; SL = Shootout losses; L = Losses; GF = Goals for; GA = Goals against; GDF = Goal Differential; PTS = Points

The regular season league standings are as follows:

Source

Playoffs

Semi Final 1

Semi Final 2

Bronze-medal game

Gold-medal game

See also

Ice Hockey Australia
Joan McKowen Memorial Trophy

References

External links 
Australian Women's Hockey League official site
Adelaide Adrenaline official site
Brisbane Goannas official site
Melbourne Ice official Site
Sydney Sirens

Australian Women's Ice Hockey League seasons
Aust
ice hockey
ice hockey